Steel on a Mission is the second studio album by American rapper Lil' ½ Dead from Long Beach, California. It was released on May 21, 1996, through Priority Records. Recording sessions took place at Westlake Audio in Los Angeles and at Total Trak Sound with producers Courtney Branch and Tracy Kendrick. It features guest appearances from Chaos and Quicc 2 Mac of Hostyle, Tha Chill of Compton's Most Wanted, Baby Girl and Tyme 4 Change. The album peaked at #47 on the Top R&B/Hip-Hop Albums and #23 on the Top Heatseekers, and the single "Southern Girl" made it to #38 on the Hot Rap Singles.

Track listing

Charts

References

External links

1996 albums
Lil' ½ Dead albums
Priority Records albums
Albums produced by Courtney Branch
Albums produced by Warryn Campbell